Tropidophis cacuangoae is a dwarf boa species in the genus Tropidophis, described in 2022.

Description 
T. cacuangoae usually grows to a length of 20 centimeters. These snakes have a skin coloring similar to those of the boa constrictor.

Distribution and habitat 
The snakes are endemic to South America, more precisely in Ecuador.

Discovery 
The dpecies was discovered in 2022 in Ecuadorian Amazon by multi-organization researchers that included Mauricio Ortega Andrade, Alexander Bentley, Claudia Koch, Mario Yánez-Muñoz and Omar Entiauspe Neto. Two specimens were found in the Colonso Chalupas national reserve and in the private Sumak Kawsay park, the discoverers reported. The specific epithet honors early 20th century indigenous rights activist Dolores Cacuango.

References 

Endemic reptiles of South America
Endemic fauna of Ecuador
Tropidophiidae
Reptiles described in 2022